Kola or Kola-Sokoro is a village and commune in the Cercle of Bougouni in the Sikasso Region of southern Mali. In 1998 the commune had a population of 2,568.

References

Populated places in Sikasso Region